Tuscan Dairy Farms is an American dairy company, headquartered in Roebling, New Jersey, and owned by Dean Foods, a subsidiary of Dairy Farmers of America.

History and operations 
Founded in 1918 by Louis Borinsky, Tuscan Dairy Farms began as a family-run distribution operation, delivering dairy products door to door on routes throughout Union and Essex counties in New Jersey. 
Tuscan Dairy Farms produces fluid milk and dairy by-products which are available to supermarkets, general wholesale, and food service outlets throughout the Northeastern United States.

Tuscan Dairy Farms reached internet phenomenon status on August 9, 2006, when The New York Times published an article relating to users of YTMND.com leaving humorous reviews on a gallon of "Tuscan Whole Milk" available on Amazon.com.

See also
 Agriculture in the United States
 Dairy farming
 List of dairy product companies in the United States

References

External links
 

1918 establishments in New Jersey
Drink companies of the United States
Companies based in Burlington County, New Jersey
Food and drink companies established in 1918
Dairy products companies of the United States
Dean Foods brands
Florence Township, New Jersey
Manufacturing companies based in New Jersey
American companies established in 1918
Food and drink companies based in New Jersey
Companies that filed for Chapter 11 bankruptcy in 2019